Abhinav Bharati High School is a private English-medium co-ed school located in 11, Pretoria street, Kolkata, West Bengal, India. This school is affiliated to CBSE. The school was established in 1945 as Abhinav Bharati Bal Mandir. The current principal of this school is Sraboni Samanta.

References

External links 
 

Private schools in Kolkata
High schools and secondary schools in Kolkata
High schools and secondary schools in West Bengal
Educational institutions established in 1945
1945 establishments in India